Gabriel Lafayette Dennis (1896–1954) was a Liberian a diplomat and politician. He and Louis Arthur Grimes were Liberia's primary delegates to the 15th assembly of the League of Nations in 1932. He was the Secretary of the Treasury from 1932 to 1940. In 1944, as World War II was ending, Dennis became Secretary of State under President William Tubman. He served in that position until 1953.

References 

1896 births
1954 deaths
Finance Ministers of Liberia
Foreign Ministers of Liberia
World War II political leaders
Permanent Representatives of Liberia to the League of Nations